Luke S. Johnson may refer to:
 Luke Johnson (Mormon), leader in the Latter Day Saint movement
 Luke S. Johnson (politician), member of the Michigan House of Representatives